Hutch Maiava (born 26 October 1976) is a New Zealand former professional rugby league footballer who played for the Cronulla-Sutherland Sharks in the NRL as a .  He previously played for the Canterbury-Bankstown Bulldogs and Hull F.C.

Playing career
A Pt Chev Pirates junior, Maiva has played in the NRL for the Canterbury-Bankstown Bulldogs, and the Cronulla-Sutherland Sharks. Maiva formerly played for Hull F.C. in the Super League but was released from his contract early due to gross misconduct.

Maiva was named in the Samoa training squad for the 2008 Rugby League World Cup.  Maiava later played for NSW Sydney Shield side the Blacktown Workers Sea Eagles.

References

External links 
Sharks Profile
Hutch Maiava NRL Player Profile
Bulldogs Profile

1976 births
Canterbury-Bankstown Bulldogs players
Cronulla-Sutherland Sharks players
Expatriate rugby league players in Australia
Hull F.C. players
Living people
Mangere East Hawks players
Mount Albert Lions players
New Zealand expatriate rugby league players
New Zealand expatriate sportspeople in Australia
New Zealand sportspeople of Samoan descent
New Zealand rugby league players
Point Chevalier Pirates players
Rugby league players from Auckland
Rugby league props
Samoa national rugby league team players
Windsor Wolves players